White Horse Ferries is a company that previously operated a ferry on the English south coast. It is a member of the White Horse group of sister companies.

Hythe Pier, Railway and Ferry

They operated the Hythe Ferry, pier and pier railway from 1991 until its sale to Blue Funnel Cruises Ltd on 19 April 2017.

Gravesend–Tilbury Ferry 1991-2000

White Horse ferries operated the Gravesend–Tilbury Ferry from 1991.  It ceased to operate the service following entry into receivership in 2000.

Lay Construction Ltd
The White Horse Group sister company Lay Construction Ltd constructed ferries for White Horse Ferries at Clifton Slipways, West Street, Gravesend.

References

External links
Official Website
P&O Ferries Case

Ferry companies of England
Companies based in Swindon